The Archdale Baronetcy, of Riversdale in the County of Fermanagh, is a title in the Baronetage of the United Kingdom. It was created on 25 June 1928 for the Northern Irish politician Edward Archdale. The second Baronet was a vice-admiral in the Royal Navy. The third Baronet was a captain in the Royal Navy.  the present holder of the baronetcy has not successfully proven his succession to the Archdale baronetcy and is therefore not on the Official Roll of the Baronetage. However, the case is under review by the Registrar of the Baronetage.

The family seat was Riversdale House, near Ballycassidy, County Fermanagh.

Archdale baronets of Riversdale, Fermanagh
Sir Edward Mervyn Archdale, 1st Baronet (1853–1943)
Sir (Nicholas) Edward Archdale, 2nd Baronet (1881–1955)
Sir Edward Archdale, 3rd Baronet (1921–2009)
Sir Nicholas Edward Archdale, 4th Baronet (b. 1965)

The heir presumptive to the title is his first cousin, Peter Mervyn Archdale (b. 1953)
The heir presumptive's heir apparent is his son, Jonathan Talbot Archdale (b. 1982)

Arms

Notes

References
Kidd, Charles, Williamson, David (editors). Debrett's Peerage and Baronetage (1990 edition). New York: St Martin's Press, 1990, 

Archdale
People from County Fermanagh